Eclipse is the second album by Glorium and was self-released on Golden Hour Records in 1997.

Track listing
 "Deserter" – 4:33
 "Speaking In Tongues" – 5:10
 "Espionage Radio" – 4:14
 "Copilot, Keep Me Awake"+ – 5:38
 "Dragon-Tiger Fight" – 3:40
 "H.C. B-Day Cake For Psychic Newborn Freaks" – 5:09
 "With It" – 2:55 
 "Blemish Party" – 3:14
 "Room On The Floor" – 8:06

Personnel
George Lara – bass
Juan Miguel Ramos – drums
Ernest Salaz – guitar, vocals
Lino Max – guitar, vocals
Paul Streckfus – vocals
 + Sarah Carlson – vocals

References

External links

Glorium albums
1997 albums